Krista Kilvet (May 31, 1946 – January 21, 2009) was an Estonian radio journalist, politician and diplomat.

Biography 
Kilvet was born on May 31, 1946, in Tallinn, Estonia. She graduated from the University of Tartu with a major in English. Between 1992 and 1995, she was elected to the Estonian parliament (Riigikogu). In August 2008, she was appointed the Ambassador of Estonia to Norway and Iceland, but wasn't able to assume to this office. Between 1970 and 1990, she was married to the actor Kaarel Kilvet. They had three daughters.

References

Further reading
 Krista Kilvet in the radio programme "Kukul külas", 11 September 2005

 Krister Kivi. Asjur, kokk, tema nõunik ja tolle autojuht, Eesti Ekspress, 26 February 2003
 Kai Kalamees.  Diplomaat Krista Kilvet lahkus pärast rasket haigust Postimees, 22 January 2009
 Allar Viivik. Pikk ja raske haigus viis raadiohääle ja diplomaadi Krista Kilveti manalateele Õhtuleht, 22 January 2009

1946 births
2009 deaths
Estonian journalists
Estonian women journalists
Estonian women diplomats
Politicians from Tallinn
Members of the Riigikogu, 1992–1995
Members of the Riigikogu, 1995–1999
University of Tartu alumni
20th-century Estonian women politicians
20th-century Estonian politicians
21st-century Estonian politicians
Women members of the Riigikogu
20th-century journalists
Burials at Pärnamäe Cemetery
21st-century Estonian women politicians